Simon Chilvers is an Australian actor. He won for the 1986 AFI Best Performance by an Actor in a Leading Role in a Mini Series for his role in The Dunera Boys. He was nominated for the same award in 1988 for True Believers and for the 1983 AFI Award for Best Actor in a Supporting Role for Buddies.

Chilvers had a main role in the TV series Rafferty's Rules.

Filmography

References

External links
 
 Biographical cuttings on Simon Chilvers, actor, containing one or more cuttings from newspapers or journals at the National Library of Australia.

Australian male film actors
Australian male television actors
Living people
Date of birth missing (living people)
1949 births